Boion may refer to:
Boium, a town of ancient Doris, in Greece
Bouyon, a town of France
Voio, a town of Greece